The Tipperary Junior A Hurling Championship is an annual championship of hurling for male players in the junior grade and is organised by the Tipperary County Board of the Gaelic Athletic Association (GAA). The championship has been awarded almost every year since the first tournament in 1910.

The series of games is played during the autumn months with the final currently being played in November. The championship has always been played on a straight knock-out basis whereby once a team loses they were eliminated from the series.

The Tipperary Junior A Hurling Championship is an integral part of the wider Munster Junior Club Hurling Championship. The winners of the Tipperary county final join the champions of the other five counties to contest the provincial championship.

Eight teams currently participate in the Tipperary Junior A Hurling Championship. Ballybacon-Grange are the current (2017) holders.

Qualification

The Tipperary Junior A Hurling Championship features eight teams in the final tournament. 28 teams contest the four divisional championships with the champions and runners-up automatically qualifying for the county series.

Roll of honour

References

Hurling competitions in County Tipperary
Tipperary GAA club championships
Junior hurling county championships